Industrial music is a form of experimental music which emerged in the 1970s. In the 1980s, industrial splintered into a range of offshoots, sometimes collectively named post-industrial music. This list details some of these offshoots, including fusions with other experimental and electronic music genres as well as rock, folk, heavy metal and hip hop. Industrial genres have spread worldwide and are particularly well represented in North America, Europe, and Japan.

Industrial music

Industrial music comprises many styles of experimental music, including many forms of electronic music. The term was coined in the mid-1970s for Industrial Records artists. The first industrial artists experimented with noise and controversial topics. Their production was not limited to music, but included mail art, performance art, installation pieces and other art forms. Prominent industrial musicians include Throbbing Gristle, Cabaret Voltaire, Boyd Rice, SPK, and Z'EV. Test Dept, Clock DVA, Nocturnal Emissions, Laibach, and The Leather Nun subsequently participated in the movement. German group Einstürzende Neubauten forged their own style, which mixed metal percussion, guitars and unconventional instruments (such as jackhammers and bones) in stage performances that often damaged the venues in which they played.

Post-industrial developments

Dark ambient

Dark ambient projects like Coil, Lilith, Nurse with Wound, Lustmord, and Zoviet France, evolved out of industrial music during the 1980s. These artists make use of non-musical material and noise, but less abrasively than other post-industrial musicians, bordering more on ambient music.  The last material that Throbbing Gristle recorded in the studio, In the Shadow of the Sun and Journey Through a Body, was ambient, and pointed in the direction that TG's offshoots (notably Coil, Chris & Cosey) would take. Other artists include Long Distance Poison, Hafler Trio, MRT, Kim Cascone, Controlled Bleeding, Nine Inch Nails (on their album Ghosts I-IV), early Techno Animal,  prominent game music composer Akira Yamaoka, Robin Rimbaud, Final and Deutsch Nepal.

Electro-industrial

Electro-Industrial draws on Electronic Body Music (EBM), and developed in the mid-1980s. While EBM has a minimal structure and clean production, electro-industrial has a deep, complex and layered sound. The style was pioneered by Skinny Puppy, Front Line Assembly, and Wumpscut. In the mid-'90s, the style spawned the dark electro and aggrotech offshoots. Other artists include Haujobb, Lab Report, and Leæther Strip.

EBM

EBM combines elements of European industrial, German electronic music such as that of Klaus Schulze, music of the Neue Deutsche Welle electropunk scene. It first came to prominence in Belgium. The name was coined by Ralf Hütter of Kraftwerk in 1978 to explain the more physical sound of their album The Man-Machine. The term was later used in its current sense by Belgian group Front 242 in 1984 to describe their EP No Comment, released in the same year. It denotes a certain type of danceable electronic music, a mixture of electropunk and industrial music. Other artists include Armageddon Dildos, Die Krupps, à;GRUMH..., A Split-Second, And One, Bigod 20, The Neon Judgement, and Attrition.

Industrial hip hop

Industrial hip hop fuses the themes and aesthetics of industrial with hip hop music. Its origins are in the work of Mark Stewart and Adrian Sherwood. In 1985, Stewart, former Pop Group singer, released As the Veneer of Democracy Starts to Fade, applying the cut-up style of industrial music with the house band of Sugar Hill Records (Doug Wimbish, Keith Leblanc, and Skip McDonald). Sherwood was a major figure in British dub music, as well as working with industrial groups such as Cabaret Voltaire, Einstürzende Neubauten, Ministry, KMFDM, and Nine Inch Nails. Tackhead, a collaboration between Sherwood and the Sugar Hill band, picked up where Stewart left off. The Disposable Heroes of Hiphoprisy, from San Francisco, and Meat Beat Manifesto, from the UK, are also early representatives of the style. The later work of Broadrick's Godflesh, as well as his collaborations with Kevin Martin, Ice, and Techno Animal, are examples of industrial hip hop. Saul Williams, a slam poet, also performs in the style. Other notable contributors include clipping., B L A C K I E, Death Grips, JPEGMafia, and Dälek.

Industrial rock and industrial metal

Industrial rock artists generally employ the basic rock instrumentation of electric guitars, drums and bass and pair it with white noise blasts, electronic music gear (synthesizers, sequencers, samplers and drum machines).  Guitars are commonly heavily distorted or otherwise effected. Bass guitars and drums may be played live, or be replaced by electronic musical instruments or computers. The early fusions of industrial music and rock were practiced by a handful of post-punk groups, including Chrome, Killing Joke, Swans, Big Black, and Foetus. Nine Inch Nails popularized industrial rock in the US with the release of Pretty Hate Machine and The Downward Spiral. Industrial metal evolved from the scene, and is practiced by groups such as Ministry, Godflesh, and Fear Factory.

Japanoise

Japanoise (a blend of the words "Japanese" and "noise") is the noise music scene of Japan. Popular and active in the 1980s and 1990s but continuing into the early 21st century, the Japanoise scene is defined by its sense of musical freedom: Groups range from the punk demolition of Hanatarash and its subsequent psychedelic Boredoms evolutions, to the tabletop electronics of Incapacitants and Merzbow. The scene was initially inspired by power electronics and sometimes deals with BDSM themes. Nonetheless, Japanoise is often less serious than other post-industrial styles, and some musicians, such as Aube, are also inspired by psychedelia or space rock.

Neofolk

Neofolk is the music of artists like Douglas Pearce of Death In June, Tony Wakeford of Sol Invictus, and David Tibet of Current 93, who had collaborated with one another. These musicians comprised a post-industrial music circle who incorporated folk music based on traditional European elements. Neofolk can be solely acoustic folk music or a blend of acoustic folk instrumentation with accompanying sounds, such as pianos, strings or elements of industrial music and experimental music. The genre encompasses an assortment of themes including traditional music, heathenry, romanticism and occultism. Neofolk musicians often have ties to other genres such as martial industrial. Apocalyptic folk predates neofolk and was used by David Tibet for the music of his band Current 93 during the late 1980s. Initially, Tibet did not intend to imply connection with the folk music genre; rather, that Current 93's music was made by "apocalyptic folk, or guys."

Power electronics

Power electronics was originally coined by William Bennett for the noise music of his own project Whitehouse. It consists of static, screeching waves of feedback, analogue synthesizers making sub-bass pulses or high frequency squealing sounds, and screamed, distorted, often hateful and offensive lyrics. Deeply atonal, there are no conventional melodies or rhythms. Members of Whitehouse who began other projects, such as Sutcliffe Jügend, also practice power electronics. Death industrial is a similar style associated with groups such as The Grey Wolves, but the term first referred to artists such as Brighter Death Now. The Swedish label Cold Meat Industry issued the releases in this subgenre.

Power noise

Power noise  (also known as rhythmic noise) takes its inspiration from some of the more structured and distorted early industrial acts, such as Esplendor Geométrico. The Belgian group Dive also anticipated the style in the early '90s. Power noise groups meld noise music with various forms of electronic dance music.  The term "power noise" was coined by Raoul Roucka of Noisex in 1997, with the track "United (Power Noise Movement)". Typically, power noise is based upon a distorted kick drum from a drum machine such as a Roland TR-909, uses militaristic 4/4 beats, and is usually instrumental.  Sometimes a melodic component is added, but this is almost always secondary to the rhythm.  Power noise tracks are typically structured and danceable, but are occasionally abstract. This genre is showcased at the annual Maschinenfest festival in Krefeld, Germany, as well as at Infest in Bradford, England. Other artists include Imminent Starvation, Axiome, Converter, and Terrorfakt. The German labels Ant-Zen and Hands Productions specialize in the style. Technoid grew out of the scene, taking inspiration from IDM, experimental techno and noise music. German label Hymen Records is responsible for the term and the style. Artists include Gridlock, Black Lung, Revolution State, and Xingu Hill.

Witch house

Witch house is a debated term referring to a fusion genre of electronic music that features a prominent hip-hop influence, specifically the 1990s Houston chopped and screwed sound pioneered by DJ Screw. Witch house consists of applying techniques rooted in Swishahouse hip-hop – drastically slowed tempos with skipping, stop-timed beats – with signifiers of noise, drone, or shoegaze, the genre recontextualizes its forebears into a sinister, unprecedented, yet aesthetically referential atmosphere. Witch house is also influenced by hazy 1980s goth bands, including Cocteau Twins, The Cure and Dead Can Dance, as well as being heavily influenced by certain early industrial bands. The use of hip-hop drum machines, noise atmospherics, creepy samples, synthpop-influenced lead melodies, and heavily altered or distorted vocals is also common.

Sales
The best-selling offshoots of industrial music are industrial rock and metal; Ministry and Nine Inch Nails both recorded platinum-selling albums. Their success led to an increase in commercial success for some other post-industrial musicians; the Nine Inch Nails remix album Further Down the Spiral, for example, which included contributions from Foetus and Coil, was certified gold in 1996.

See also
Musique concrète
Synth pop
Synthwave
Coldwave
Dark wave
Ethereal wave
Grindcore
Metalcore
Progressive metal
Krautrock
Rivethead
Surrealist music
Techno
Techstep
Brostep
Neurofunk
Electropunk
Glitch
Breakcore
Speedcore
Darkcore
Digital hardcore
Cyber Metal
Cybergrind
Groove Metal
Neue Deutsche Härte
Trace metal
Psychedelic trance
Electronicore
Djent
Mathcore
Rap Metal
Chopped and screwed
Wonky
Deconstructed club
Shoegaze
Dream Pop
Noise Pop
Noise Rock
No Wave
Black Metal
Drone
Drone Metal
Dungeon synth
Harsh noise wall
Illbient

References

Bibliography

Further reading

External links
 alphamanbeast's noise directory
  The Birth of Experimental Music (pop music/experimental)

Music
Industrial music
Industrial music